1660 Wood, provisional designation , is a stony Phocaea asteroid from the inner regions of the asteroid belt, approximately 12 kilometers in diameter. It was named after British–South African astronomer Harry Edwin Wood.

Discovery 

Wood was discovered on 7 April 1953, by South African astronomer Jacobus Bruwer at Johannesburg Observatory in South Africa. It was the second numbered discovery made by Bruwer. He also discovered the minor planets 1658 Innes, 1794 Finsen, and 3284 Niebuhr. The asteroid 1811 Bruwer was named in his honour by the Dutch, Dutch-American astronomer trio of the Palomar–Leiden survey.

Orbit and classification 

Wood is a S-type asteroid and member of the Phocaea family. It orbits the Sun in the inner main-belt at a distance of 1.7–3.1 AU once every 3 years and 9 months (1,354 days). Its orbit has an eccentricity of 0.30 and an inclination of 21° with respect to the ecliptic.

Physical characteristics

Rotation period 

From January to March 2012, four rotational lightcurves of Wood were obtained from photometric observations taken by astronomers Julian Oey, Kevin Hills, and Xianming Han. Lightcurve analysis gave a concurring rotation period of 6.809 hours with a brightness variation between of 0.14 and 0.26 magnitude.

Diameter and albedo 

According to the survey carried out by NASA's Wide-field Infrared Survey Explorer with its subsequent NEOWISE mission, Wood measures 11.34 kilometers in diameter, and its surface has an albedo of 0.239. The Collaborative Asteroid Lightcurve Link assumes an albedo of 0.23 and calculates a diameter of 12.67 kilometers with an absolute magnitude of 11.7.

Naming 

This minor planet was named for British–South African astronomer Harry Edwin Wood (1881–1946), who was the second director of the Union Observatory at which the asteroid was discovered, and who had discovered 12 asteroids himself between 1911 and 1928. He had the prime responsibility for the famous Franklin-Adams Star Camera (Franklin-Adams photographic refractor) since its acquisition in 1909 (also see 1925 Franklin-Adams). The official  was published by the Minor Planet Center on 1 July 1972.

References

External links 
 Asteroid Lightcurve Database (LCDB), query form (info )
 Dictionary of Minor Planet Names, Google books
 Asteroids and comets rotation curves, CdR – Observatoire de Genève, Raoul Behrend
 Discovery Circumstances: Numbered Minor Planets (1)-(5000) – Minor Planet Center
 
 

001660
Discoveries by Jacobus Albertus Bruwer
Named minor planets
001660
19530407